On March 16, 2004, an explosion destroyed a corner section of a nine-storey Soviet-era apartment building in Arkhangelsk, Russia. It happened at 3:03 a.m. local time (UTC +3).  The explosion occurred in 120 Avenue of the Soviet Cosmonauts in the October district (Oktyabrskiy rayon)  of Arkhangelsk.

The death toll from the explosion was 58 (33 women, 16 men and 9 children). Two of the dead succumbed to their wounds in a hospital after being rescued.

The explosion came two days after Vladimir Putin won reelection and several weeks after a suicide bombing killed 41 Moscow Metro passengers.

In April 2004, authorities arrested and charged 26-year-old former employee of city gas services Sergey Alekseychik. On December 16, 2005 he was sentenced to 25 years in prison. According to the official version, Alekseychik was fired from his natural gas technician job several days prior to the explosion, and to get even with his former employers and the city, he sabotaged the gas system thus causing the tragedy.

See also 
Arkhangelsk FSB office bombing

References

Explosions in 2004
2004 industrial disasters
2004 disasters in Russia
Gas explosions in Russia
Arkhangelsk
March 2004 events in Russia
Mass murder in 2004
21st-century mass murder in Russia